Kalle Kiiskinen (born 6 September 1975 in Hyvinkää) is a Finnish curler.

In Juniors, Kiiskinen played for Perttu Piilo and won a silver medal as his third at the 1997 World Junior Curling Championships.

Kiiskinen then joined up with Uusipaavalniemi, playing in his first World Curling Championships in 2002. He has played both second and third for Uusipaavalniemi. While never winning a medal at the worlds, at the 2006 Winter Olympics, Kiiskinen was a member of the Finnish team (skipped by Uusipaavalniemi) who won a silver medal.

After parting ways with Uusipaavalniemi, Kalle was the skip of the Finnish team in the 2007 European Curling Championships

External links

1975 births
Living people
People from Hyvinkää
Finnish male curlers
Curlers at the 2006 Winter Olympics
Olympic curlers of Finland
Olympic silver medalists for Finland
Olympic medalists in curling
Medalists at the 2006 Winter Olympics
Continental Cup of Curling participants
Sportspeople from Uusimaa
21st-century Finnish people